Negreet High School is a K-12 school in the unincorporated community of Negreet in Sabine Parish, Louisiana, United States.  It is a part of the Sabine Parish School Board.

History
In January 2014, the ACLU filed suit against the Sabine Parish School Board, Superintendent Sara Ebarb, Principal Gene Wright and teacher Rita Roark of Negreet High School, alleging officials at one of its schools harassed a sixth-grader because of his Buddhist faith and that the district routinely pushes Christian beliefs upon their students.   In March 2014, the U.S. District Court approved a consent decree, a court order agreed to by both parties, requiring the Sabine Parish School Board to put an end to a variety of alleged unconstitutional practices at Negreet High School and other Sabine Parish Schools.

Athletics
Negreet High athletics competes in the LHSAA.

References

External links
 
 Consent Decree Order in April 2014, Sabine Parish School Board

Public high schools in Louisiana
Public middle schools in Louisiana
Public elementary schools in Louisiana
Schools in Sabine Parish, Louisiana